KXLT-TV (channel 47) is a television station licensed to Rochester, Minnesota, United States, serving as the Fox affiliate for Southeast Minnesota and Northern Iowa. It is owned by SagamoreHill Broadcasting alongside Telemundo affiliate KXSH-LD (channel 35); SagamoreHill maintains a shared services agreement (SSA) with Gray Television, owner of dual NBC/CW+ affiliate KTTC (channel 10), for the provision of certain services. The stations share studios in Rochester on Bandel Road Northwest along US 52, and also maintain an advertising sales office on Lakeview Drive in Clear Lake, Iowa, that serves Mason City. KXLT-TV's transmitter is located in Grand Meadow Township, Minnesota.

History

KXLI satellite
KXLT signed-on for the first time on August 21, 1987 as a full-time satellite of St. Cloud–based independent outlet KXLI. It was the market's first independent station, as well as the area's first new commercial station in 33 years. Its programming consisted mostly of low-budget syndicated fare and cartoons, though for a time it also aired Minnesota North Stars hockey. However, it found the going difficult, not in the least because KMSP-TV and WFTC, two independent stations from Minneapolis–Saint Paul, were both already available on cable.

KXLI / KXLT were owned by Halcomm Inc. with its majority stockholder and president Dale W. Lang, chairman of magazine publisher Lang Communications Inc. Lang attempted with partners to create the "Minnesota Independent Network" (MIN) with 11 stations but never got past planning and initial work.

Lang also made a $9.6 million loan to Halcomm. The station closed down in December 1988 with Lang calling the loan in 1989 taking possession of the stations.

In 1989, Lang became the primary investor in a new television network, the Star Television Network, which featured 4 hours of infomercials and 8 hours of classic programming under the TV Heaven banner. KXLT returned on September 29, 1990 again simulcasting KXLI programming as an owned and operated Star station, with both stations on the air 22 hours a day. Following the closure of Star in January 1991, KXLI / KXLT implemented a schedule of infomercials, religious programming and the Home Shopping Network.

As a KXLI satellite, KXLT operated at lower-than-licensed power due to KXLI's financial problems. KXLI and KXLT were sold to Paxson Communications in 1996 which converted both stations to an all-infomercial format under Paxson's "inTV" network. In 1997, Paxson decided to sell KXLT to raise money to launch the Pax network (today's Ion Television). Late that year, Shockley Communications purchased KXLT.

Fox affiliate
On January 19, 1998, Shockley relaunched the station as a Fox affiliate. Previously, cable systems on the Minnesota side of the market carried WFTC (and before it KMSP) while those on the Iowa side carried KDSM-TV from Des Moines. Shockley instantly invested in the station upgrading it to full power operations and moving to new studios in November of that year. On November 1, 1998 in partnership with The WB, KXLT established a cable-only affiliate of the network. Known by the faux calls "KWBR", the station was programmed by the national The WB 100+ service but local promotion and advertising sales were handled by KXLT.

In 2001, Shockley Communications was bought by Quincy Newspapers, owner of KTTC. However, Quincy could not buy KXLT due to Federal Communications Commission (FCC) rules governing duopolies. The FCC does not allow two of the four highest-rated stations to be owned by one company. Additionally, Rochester/Austin/Mason City has only six full-power stations, not enough to legally permit a duopoly in any case. Nevertheless, Quincy took over KXLT's operations under a shared services agreement. As part of the arrangement, Quincy provides all technical support, promotions, commercial production, and master control for KXLT. Shockley would later sell the station to current owner SagamoreHill Broadcasting in 2005.

In September 2006, The WB and UPN merged to create The CW. KTTC subsequently established a new second digital subchannel to offer The CW through The CW Plus, a similar national programming service as The WB 100+. At that point, the "KWBR" operation was shut down. KXLT has been digital-only since February 17, 2009  with it remaining on-air for a few more days airing "nightlight" service. KXLT's digital facility on channel 46 has been fully operational since 2004 until 2018 when the station relocated to channel 26 in the repack.

News operation

Through a news share agreement in place since 2001, KTTC produces a half-hour prime time newscast on KXLT seen Sunday through Friday nights. Known as Fox 47 News at Nine, the program originates from a secondary set at the Bandel Road Northwest studios. It features a unique graphics package and news music theme that is different from KTTC. KXLT uses most of the NBC outlet's on-air personnel but maintains separate news anchors who can report for KTTC.

At some point in 2009, CBS affiliate KIMT (channel 3) added the market's second prime time local news show at 9 to its MyNetworkTV-affiliated second digital subchannel. This newscast could be seen for thirty minutes competing with KXLT's broadcast. Eventually, the effort would be reduced to a five-minute weather cut-in featuring an updated forecast. On March 21, 2011 a day after KTTC performed an upgrade to high definition news production, KXLT completed the switch. With the change to HD came an updated set of graphics (still separate from the NBC station). On July 28, 2014, KXLT debuted a weekday morning show known as FOX in the Morning (that is produced by KTTC). Airing for thirty minutes at 8 a.m., the program is formatted with news, weather, local features and entertainment segments. FOX in the Morning is the area's only 8 a.m. newscast. Nicholas Quallich, anchor, Ted Schmidt, meteorologist, have been with the show since its summertime 2014 premiere. Tori Bokios, who joined channel 47 in January 2015, as of the summer of 2015, is the anchor of "FOX 47 News at 9 p.m." Amanda Hari is the newest member of the morning show, arriving in September 2015, replacing Bokios. In December 2016, Quallich left KXLT, leaving Hari & Schmidt to handle the morning news. Earlier in 2016, Chief Meteorologist Randy Brock left his post and went on to pursue a career in real estate. He said that part of his decision was to spend more time with his family.

On September 27, 2019, FOX in the Morning broadcast its last show, with anchor Jack Keenan and meteorologist Ted Schmidt. The 30 minute slot for the morning was used to expand Fox 47 News at Nine to a one-hour broadcast in January 2020, anchored by Maddy Wierus and Chief Meteorologist Nick Jansen.

The evening program on KXLT maintains separate anchors from KTTC (except for weather segments) and its own graphics scheme. The NBC outlet also maintains an Austin Bureau, within the Riverland Community College campus, on 8th Avenue Northwest.

Subchannels 
The station's digital signal is multiplexed:

References

External links

MeTVRochester.com - Official MeTV Rochester website

Television channels and stations established in 1987
1987 establishments in Minnesota
XLT-TV
Fox network affiliates
MeTV affiliates
Laff (TV network) affiliates
Ion Mystery affiliates
Quest (American TV network) affiliates
Gray Television
SagamoreHill Broadcasting